Bogert's monitor (Varanus bogerti) is a species of tree-dwelling lizard in the family Varanidae. The species is native to Papua New Guinea.

Etymology
Both the specific name, bogerti, and the common name, Bogert's monitor, are in honor of American herpetologist Charles Mitchill Bogert.

Geographic range
V. bogerti is found on the D'Entrecasteaux Islands and the Trobriand Islands of Papua New Guinea.

Habitat

Reproduction
V. bogerti is an oviparous species.

References

Further reading
Koch A, Ernst N, Eidenmüller B, Kraus F (2014). "New data on the rare Varanus bogerti Mertens, 1950 and V. telenesetes Sprackland, 1991 (Squamata: Varanidae), two endemic monitor lizard taxa from island groups off southeastern New Guinea". Herpetological Journal 24 (2): 111–122.
Mertens R (1950). "Notes on some Indo-Australian monitors (Sauria, Varanidae)". American Museum Novitates (1456): 1–7. (Varanus prasinus bogerti, new subspecies, pp. 3–6, Figure 1),
Ziegler T, Schmitz A, Koch A, Böhme W (2007). "A review of the subgenus Euprepiosaurus of Varanus (Squamata: Varanidae): morphological and molecular phylogeny, distribution and zoogeography, with an identification key for the members of the V. indicus and the V. prasinus species groups". Zootaxa 1472: 1-28.

Varanus
Reptiles described in 1950
Monitor lizards of New Guinea
Taxa named by Robert Mertens